Thomas Henry Buckley (September 5, 1897 – December 1, 1960) was an American politician who served as Massachusetts Auditor from 1935 to 1939.

Buckley was not a relative of Thomas J. Buckley, who also served as Massachusetts Auditor (1941–1964).

References

Bibliography
 Curtis, Georgina Pell.: The American Catholic Who's Who, page 40, (1943).
 Clark, William Horace.: The Story of Massachusetts, page 110, (1938).
 Howard, Richard T.: Public officials of Massachusetts, page 25, (1935).

 
 

State auditors of Massachusetts
1897 births
1960 deaths
20th-century American politicians